The Schlesische Zeitung (Silesian Newspaper) was a newspaper in Prussia and the German Reich. It was founded in 1742 and ceased publication in 1945.

It was founded when the Breslau bookseller Johann Jacob Korn was granted the newspaper concession by Frederick II of Prussia after Prussia seized power in Silesia. On 3 January 1742 Korn published a new newspaper under the title Schlesische Privilegierte Staats-, Kriegs- und Friedenszeitung. Initially published three times a week, it sold 1,200 to 1300 copies in 1801 from eight hand-operated presses. It became the Schlesische privilegirte Zeitung in 1813 and in its 34th edition on 20 March 1813 it published An Mein Volk, Frederick William III of Prussia's speech which triggered the German campaign of the Napoleonic Wars – by that time it was available in all royal post offices in Prussia.

Defunct newspapers published in Germany
Publications established in 1742
Publications disestablished in 1945
1945 disestablishments in Germany
1742 establishments in Prussia